Okura Nikko Hotel Management Co., Ltd. (formerly JAL Hotels Company Ltd.) is a Japanese-owned global hotel management firm, majority owned by Hotel Okura Co., Ltd. since 2010. The hotel firm's managed properties are marketed under the Okura Hotels & Resorts and Hotel JAL City and Nikko Hotels International groups. From its time as a subsidiary of Japan Airlines (JAL), its headquarters have been located in the JAL Building in Shinagawa, Tokyo, Japan. In 2010, Japan Airlines sold majority ownership of JAL Hotels to the Hotel Okura, which is now the primary shareholder.

History
JAL Hotels has been a hotel management company since its establishment in 1970 as a subsidiary of Japan Airlines Co. Ltd.

On July 1, 1996, Japan Airlines Development Ltd. was renamed to "JAL Hotels Company Ltd." to further establish its business description as a hotel operator.

On April 1, 1999, a merger with "Japan Airlines Hotel Co., Ltd." resulted in JAL Hotels taking over the management of the "Ginza Nikko Hotel" and "Kawasaki Nikko Hotel".

On September 30, 2010, the sale of JAL Hotels to Hotel Okura Co., Ltd. resulted in JAL Hotels becoming mainly owned by Hotel Okura, which holds 79.6% shares in the company, while Japan Airlines retains 11.1%; with 9.3% held by banks, other investors.

The company renamed itself as Okura Nikko Hotel Management Co., Ltd. on 1 October, 2015.

Brands
Operating under the "Okura Hotels & Resorts",  "Hotel JAL City" and "Nikko Hotels International" groups, JAL Hotels has managed 67 properties worldwide, with a total inventory of 21,406 guest rooms. Since 2010, its acquisition by Hotel Okura has increased the total guest rooms networked. As of today, it has 86 properties (opened or announced), including 50 in Japan, 11 in China and 25 in the rest of Asia and other countries.

Notable properties

 Grand Nikko Tokyo Daiba
 Hotel JAL City Haneda Tokyo
 Hotel Nikko San Francisco
 Hotel Nikko Düsseldorf
 Hotel Nikko Saigon
 Hotel Nikko Bali Benoa Beach
 Hotel Nikko Kluang

See also 

 List of Nikko Hotels

References

External links

Hospitality companies established in 1970
Hospitality companies of Japan
Japanese brands
Japan Airlines
Service companies based in Tokyo
Japanese companies established in 1970